Lowell Bennett (born May 14, 1958) is an American stock car racing driver. The Neenah, Wisconsin native has competed in the NASCAR Busch Series, the World Series of Asphalt, and has five Slinger Nationals championships. He continues to race in Wisconsin, primarily at Wisconsin International Raceway (WIR).

Racing career

Early years 
Bennett started racing on dirt, in a 1972 Chevrolet Chevelle bought from his father. The first track that he raced on was Shawano Speedway, just outside of Shawano, Wisconsin. Bennett's first year of racing was 1976; he won his first race at Shawano and it paid $80. In the following years, Bennett raced at Shawano, and in De Pere and Seymour, Wisconsin at dirt tracks. In 1981, he tried his hand at asphalt racing and raced at Shawano and Slinger Speedway, after winning a track championship at Shawano that year and one more year of double duty in 1982, Bennett decided to back down his schedule. He continued to race at local tracks through the end of the 1900s, eventually transitioning to the half-mile paved oval at Wisconsin International Raceway. Bennett won his first Slinger Nationals title in 1997, then followed it up in 2000, 2004, 2007 and 2010 to come out with a total of five championships.

NASCAR 
Running a self-funded team, Bennett ran seven total races in the NASCAR Busch Series (now the Xfinity Series). Three were in 2002, and two each in 2003 and 2004. He scored a best finish of 21st, at the Indianapolis Raceway Park in 2002.

Post-NASCAR 
Bennett has continued to run at Wisconsin International Raceway and Slinger Speedway, winning the prestigious Red, White and Blue championship at the former and the Slinger Nationals at the latter. His son Braison now runs at WIR and other regional touring series as part of the 2017 Kulwicki Driver Development Program.

Personal life 
Bennett's father Bobby was a local late model driver who also served in the United States Army. Lowell was 1st of ten kids born in the family (hence the car number 2 as Bobby was #1, Lowell #2, and down the lines it went with all 6 boys in his racing family) and was born in Germany while his father was on tour.

Motorsports career results

NASCAR
(key) (Bold – Pole position awarded by qualifying time. Italics – Pole position earned by points standings or practice time. * – Most laps led.)

Busch Series

References

External links

 

1958 births
Living people
Sportspeople from Neenah, Wisconsin
Racing drivers from Wisconsin
NASCAR drivers
ARCA Midwest Tour drivers